The Château de Roquefort-les-Pins is a ruined castle located at the summit of a hill in Castellas in the commune of Roquefort-les-Pins in the Alpes-Maritimes département of France. According to local tradition, it was the refuge of Féraud de Cabris, a monk and prior, whose men terrorised the whole of Provence, causing Robert, Count of Savoy, to destroy the castle.

History
The castle was destroyed in 1341 in dramatic circumstances, as witnessed by an ancient text reproduced on a panel on the site:

See also
List of castles in France

References

Ruined castles in Provence-Alpes-Côte d'Azur
Buildings and structures in Alpes-Maritimes